British Alexander Mitchell (born June 28, 1982), who performs under the stage name Brisco, is an American rapper.

Early life

Mitchell grew up in Miami, Florida. His mother died when he was 9, and four years later, at age 13, his brother was killed in a car accident; he then migrated to Opa-Locka, Florida. At age 14, the troubled teen's cousin introduced him to his best friend, E-Class, the founder of Poe Boy Entertainment.

Music career
Mitchell met Poe Boy Entertainment founder E-Class in 1997. E-Class encouraged him to express his life hardships through rap.

In 2006, Mitchell, under stage name Brisco, did guest performances on tracks from DJ Khaled's Listennn... the Album ("The Future of Dade") and Rick Ross's Port of Miami ("I'm a G", also with Lil Wayne). Lil Wayne signed Brisco to Cash Money Records in November that year. Brisco began recording an album for Poe Boy and Cash Money, Street Medicine, in 2007 which resulted in popular records such as "I'm Into Dat" and "Opa-locka". He also made his big debut with Cash Money on Lil' Wayne's mixtape Da Drought 3 on a song called New Cash Money.

Brisco continued doing many guest appearances in 2007 and 2008, such as for albums We the Best by DJ Khaled ("I'm From Dade County"), Tha Carter III by Lil Wayne ("La La"), and Mail on Sunday by Flo Rida ("Money Right"). He also released his own singles, "In the Hood" (featuring Lil Wayne Produced by COONEY and KaneBeatz) and "Just Know Dat" (remix featuring Flo Rida and Lil Wayne Produced by COONEY and co produced by CP HOLLYWOOD) and appeared in Billy Blue's "Get Like Me". In late 2008, Brisco released a mixtape with DJ Bigga Rankin, From Dade to Duval, part of Rankin's Real Nigga Radio series. In the summer of 2009 Brisco showed his diversity with a charismatic feature on the song entitled "Catch 22" which was written and performed for Miami's well known ghost writer Dray Skky.  For Brisco's highly anticipated debut LP, Street Medicine, he plans to create lyrics based on his real-life experiences and to "mix club tracks, sex tracks and religious tracks." The lead single from the album is entitled "On the Wall" featuring Lil Wayne. Street Medicine had a planned release date of December 2010 but ultimately never released.

Brisco released a diss record aimed at rappers Gucci Mane, OJ Da Juiceman and Waka Flocka Flame called "Waka Blacka". This song surfaced shortly after Waka got shot on a Tuesday in Atlanta. He states that he only released this after Gucci Mane dissed him on his song "Heavy", referencing an incident. The entertainers have since put their differences behind them.

In February 2011, it was revealed that he would take part in a new Hiphop/Pro Wrestling collaboration, the Urban Wrestling Federation with taping of the first bout "First Blood" taking place in June 2011.

In October 2012, Brisco released a single titled "Chocolate Dream", which was produced by Fatboi and featured Ricco Barrino on the assist.

In 2020, He has appeared on Love & Hip Hop: Miami.

Discography

Albums

Studio albums

Mixtapes

Singles

As lead artist

As featured performer

Other charted songs

Guest appearances

Music videos

Notes 

A  "Just Know Dat" did not enter the Hot R&B/Hip-Hop Songs chart, but peaked at number 13 on the Bubbling Under R&B/Hip-Hop Singles chart, which acts as a 25-song extension to the Hot R&B/Hip-Hop Songs chart.
B  "La La" did not enter the Hot R&B/Hip-Hop Songs chart, but peaked at number 6 on the Bubbling Under R&B/Hip-Hop Singles chart, which acts as a 25-song extension to the Hot R&B/Hip-Hop Songs chart.

References

External links
Brisco on Myspace

1982 births
African-American male rappers
American male rappers
Cash Money Records artists
Living people
People from Opa-locka, Florida
Rappers from Miami
Republic Records artists
Southern hip hop musicians
Young Money Entertainment artists
21st-century American rappers
21st-century American male musicians
21st-century African-American musicians
20th-century African-American people